High Bridge is a railway station in High Bridge, Hunterdon County, New Jersey, United States. The station is the western terminus of the New Jersey Transit's Raritan Valley Line. The next station eastward is Annandale. The parking lot for the station is located one block to the west. The station only uses the southern track for inbound and outbound trains. The former Central Railroad of New Jersey station house, constructed in 1913, is currently used for storage and there is a covered waiting area under the building canopy. This station has no weekend service.

The railroad, and the moniker of High Bridge, was constructed in 1852 through the valley. Despite causing a boom to a local iron works, the railroad did not establish a station in the area until 1856. Until 1983, Raritan Valley service continued westward to Phillipsburg, New Jersey. Limited service and low ridership led NJ Transit to discontinue all service west of High Bridge. Since service ended, there have been repeated investigations and requests for daily service to be extended back to Phillipsburg.

History

Construction 
The Central Railroad of New Jersey constructed an extension of the former Elizabeth and Somerville Railroad from Clinton (modern-day Annandale) in 1852. In order to complete the railroad, it required traversing the Raritan River valley. This was problematic for the planners, who finally decided that a high bridge was the route to go in constructing the line. The bridge involved eight massive piers of  stone. The construction of the bridge cost $200,000 (1852 USD).

Construction of the railroad through the valley in 1852 did not involve a station at the current site. Despite no station, the railroad influenced a renaissance of industry in the area. The railroad construction caused the iron works in the area, run by Lewis Taylor, to gain new business. The iron works, which closed in 1783 due to lack of transportation and access, reopened in 1851. With the railroad, Taylor added new furnaces in 1852 and 1854, as well as new items in 1853 and 1856. With the 1856 expansion of the Taylor-Wharton Iron Works, the village in the area expanded, with a railroad station opened at the location. Taylor himself, opened a company store not far from the new station.

However, the high bridge through the area did not last very long. In 1852, the railroad discovered that the bridge was not firm as the bridge swayed when trains would cross. With the train on top, it would depress the track and make it rise as the equipment crossed the structure. When the railroad decided what to do about the unsafe bridge, they first considered an all-stone structure. That was turned down in favor of filling in the bridge. Construction on the new fill began in 1859. Progress began in 1860, with the large stone piers and the bridge being filled in by dirt. The cost of filling in the bridge cost $500,000 (1865 USD), covering about $60,000 worth of railroad. Filling in two of the bridge's arches cost $80,000 alone. Sidney Dillon, a local contractor, brought one of the first steam shovels in the region to the area to finish the job. The bridge was filled in by 1865.

Station layout
The station has a single low-level asphalt side platform. There is an asphalt walkway over the station track providing access to the outer track.

Bibliography

References

External links

world.nycsubway.org - NJT Raritan Line
 Bridge Street entrance from Google Maps Street View

Railway stations in the United States opened in 1856
NJ Transit Rail Operations stations
Former Central Railroad of New Jersey stations
Railway stations in Hunterdon County, New Jersey
1856 establishments in New Jersey